Ancistrobasis is a genus of sea snails, marine gastropod mollusks in the family Seguenziidae.

Dall (1889) regarded (with some doubt) Ancistrobasis as a section of the closely related genus Basilissa Watson, 1879.

Description
This genus contains the dentate forms of species formerly included in the genus Basilissa.

Shell: The conical shell shows peripheral carina and collabral axial riblets. The midwhorl angulation and the spiral lirae are present on all whorls. The posterior sinus depth is shallow. The posterior sinus has an U-shape. The anterolateral sinus is absent. The rhomboidal aperture contains a basal and columellar sinus. The umbilical septum (a transverse plate secreted with early formed whorls of the shell) is absent. The shell contains pustulate microsculpture.

Radula: The rachidian tooth is broader than high with lateral wings prominent. The lateral tooth cusp is broad. The radula contains less than 10 marginal tooth pairs.

Species
Species within the genus Ancistrobasis include:
Ancistrobasis adonis Marshall, 1991
Ancistrobasis boucheti Marshall, 1991
Ancistrobasis caledonica Marshall, 1991
Ancistrobasis compsa Melvill, 1904
Ancistrobasis depressa (Dall, 1889)
Ancistrobasis dilecta Marshall, 1983
Ancistrobasis largoi Poppe, Tagaro & Dekker, 2006
Ancistrobasis monodon (Schepman, 1908)
Ancistrobasis reticulata (Philippi, 1844)
Ancistrobasis scitula Marshall, 1991
Ancistrobasis tiara Marshall, 1991
Ancistrobasis zumbii Lima, Christoffersen & Barros, 2013
Species brought into synonymy
Ancistrobasis costulata (Watson, 1879): synonym of Ancistrobasis reticulata (Philippi, 1844)
Ancistrobasis regina Marshall, 1983: synonym of Basilissopsis regina (Marshall, 1983)

References

 Marshall B.A. (1991). Mollusca Gastropoda : Seguenziidae from New Caledonia and the Loyalty Islands. In A. Crosnier & P. Bouchet (Eds) Résultats des campagnes Musorstom, vol. 7. Mémoires du Muséum National d'Histoire Naturelle, A, 150:41-109

 
Seguenziidae
Gastropod genera